The Ministry of Foreign Trade and Economic Relations of Bosnia and Herzegovina is the governmental department in charge of foreign trade policy and economic relations of Bosnia and Herzegovina.

History
The Ministry of Foreign Trade and Economic Relations of Bosnia and Herzegovina was established in the first post-war 1996 Bosnian general election, while the ministry began its work on 3 January 1997, headed by minister Hasan Muratović (SDA), after the first post-war government in Bosnia and Herzegovina was proclaimed between the Party of Democratic Action (SDA), the Croatian Democratic Union (HDZ BiH) and the Serb Democratic Party (SDS), also headed by Muratović.

Organization
The Ministry of Foreign Trade and Economic Relations of Bosnia and Herzegovina is organized into seven sectors, which are reorganized into a total of 32 departments, and one inspectorate.
Sector for Foreign Trade Policy and Foreign Investments (6 departments)
Sector for International Trade Relations (4 departments)
Sector for Customs Policy and Tariffs (3 departments)
Sector for Economic Development and Entrepreneurship (4 departments)
Sector for Natural Resources, Energy and Environmental Protection (6 departments)
Sector for Legal and General Affairs (5 departments)
Agriculture, Food, Forestry and Rural Development Sector (4 departments)
Inspectorate

List of ministers

Ministers of Foreign Trade and Economic Relations of Bosnia and Herzegovina (1997–present)

Political parties:

References

External links

Foreign Trade and Economic Relations
Foreign Trade
Bosnia and Herzegovina, Foreign Trade and Economic Relations